Mimastra is a genus of skeletonizing leaf beetles in the family Chrysomelidae. There are more than 60 described species in Mimastra. They are found in Indomalaya and the Palearctic.

Species
These 69 species belong to the genus Mimastra:

 Mimastra alternata (Jacoby, 1896)
 Mimastra andrewesi Bezděk, 2010
 Mimastra anicka Bezděk, 2011
 Mimastra annadalei (Jacoby, 1905)
 Mimastra aptera Takizawa, 1990
 Mimastra arcuata Baly, 1865
 Mimastra australis Takizawa, 1986
 Mimastra badia Kimoto, 1989
 Mimastra birmanica Bryant, 1954
 Mimastra brevicollis (Allard, 1889)
 Mimastra capitata Jacoby, 1887
 Mimastra chennelli Baly, 1897
 Mimastra costatipennis Jacoby, 1903
 Mimastra cyanura (Hope, 1831)
 Mimastra elegans (Allard, 1889)
 Mimastra davidis (Fairmaire, 1878)
 Mimastra fortipunctata Maulik, 1936
 Mimastra fouqueorum Bezděk & Lee, 2012
 Mimastra fulva Kimoto, 1983
 Mimastra gracilicornis Jacoby, 1889
 Mimastra gracilis Baly, 1878
 Mimastra grahami Gressitt & Kimoto, 1963
 Mimastra guerryi (Laboissière, 1929)
 Mimastra hajeki Bezděk, 2017
 Mimastra hsuehleeae Bezděk & Lee, 2012  (temperate Asia)
 Mimastra itoi (Takizawa, 1986)
 Mimastra jacobyi Bezděk, 2010
 Mimastra javana (Weise, 1922)
 Mimastra jelineki Bezděk, 2009
 Mimastra kandyensis Maulik, 1936
 Mimastra kremitovskyi Bezděk, 2009
 Mimastra laotica Bezděk & Lee, 2012
 Mimastra latimana Allard, 1890
 Mimastra levmedvedevi Romantsov, 2017
 Mimastra leyteana Medvedev, 1995
 Mimastra longicornis (Allard, 1888)
 Mimastra lunata (Kollar & Redtenbacher, 1844)
 Mimastra maai (Gressitt & Kimoto, 1936)
 Mimastra malvi (Chen, 1942)
 Mimastra modesta (Fairmaire, 1889)
 Mimastra nilgiriensis Bezděk, 2010
 Mimastra nitida Maulik, 1936
 Mimastra oblonga (Gyllenhal, 1808)
 Mimastra pallida Jacoby, 1896
 Mimastra parva (Allard, 1889)
 Mimastra persimilis Kimoto, 1989
 Mimastra platteeuwi (Duvivier, 1890)
 Mimastra polita (Jacoby, 1889)
 Mimastra procerula Zhang, Yang, Cui & Li, 2006
 Mimastra pygidialis Laboissière, 1929
 Mimastra quadrinotata (Gressitt & Kimoto, 1963)
 Mimastra quadripartita Baly, 1879
 Mimastra riedeli Bezděk, 2009
 Mimastra robusta Jacoby, 1887
 Mimastra rugosa (Jacoby, 1886)
 Mimastra schneideri Bezděk & Lee, 2012
 Mimastra scutellata (Jacoby, 1904)
 Mimastra semimarginata (Jacoby, 1886)
 Mimastra shahidi (Abdullah & Qureshi, 1968)
 Mimastra soreli Baly, 1878
 Mimastra strejceki Bezděk, 2010
 Mimastra submetallica (Jacoby, 1884)
 Mimastra sumatrensis (Jacoby, 1896)
 Mimastra suwai Takizawa, 1988
 Mimastra tarsalis Medvedev, 2009
 Mimastra tenuelimbata Lopatin, 2004
 Mimastra terminata (Allard, 1889)
 Mimastra uncitarsis Laboissière, 1940
 Mimastra violaceipennis (Jacoby, 1884)

References

Galerucinae
Chrysomelidae genera
Taxa named by Joseph Sugar Baly